MV Doulos Phos is a retired ocean liner, and former cruise ship that held the record of being the world's oldest active ocean-faring passenger ship, serving from 1914 until December 2009. She is now owned by Eric Saw, director and chief executive of BizNaz Resources International Pte Ltd in Singapore. She was previously operated by the German charity Gute Bücher für Alle (Good Books for All), and was used as a floating bookshop. The ship has previously been known as the SS Medina, the SS Roma, the MS Franca C, and the MV Doulos.  The Doulos ended her final cruise in late 2009 at Singapore, with the ship being handed over to her new owners on 18 March 2010.  The ship underwent a three year conversion into a luxury hotel that saw the ship mounted on dry land in nearby Bintan, Indonesia and opened in June 2019.

Cargo ship era
On 28 August 1913, a contract for two steel freight steamships was signed by Newport News Shipbuilding and Dry Dock Company and the Mallory Steamship Company of the United States. "The vessel will be a single screw steamship of the hurricane deck type with straight stem and elliptical stern, and with deck houses amidship and aft for the crew accommodations...." The original specifications referred to the vessels as hulls No. 175 and No. 176.  Hull No. 175 would eventually be named SS Neches and hull No. 176 became SS "Medina". (Neches would be lost in a collision with British warship in 1918.) The full contract for the vessels filled a 186-page volume and included the fittings commonly used in a ship for her era and also provision for tropical itineraries – mosquito nets for the crew quarters.

Terrorist attack
On 11 August 1991, during the final night of the MV Doulos''' stop in the southern Philippine port of Zamboanga City, two of her foreign crewmembers were killed when a grenade thrown by members of the Abu Sayyaf Islamist terrorist group exploded on stage during a performance by its Christian volunteers. Four locals were killed and 32 others were injured, including several crew members of the missionary ship.

In 1995, in order to conform to then new SOLAS regulations, she was fitted with a sprinkler system and combustible wall panels were removed and replaced. This unfortunately meant the loss of many of her wall murals that had been installed by Costa.

In 2006, while in Bahrain, a satellite communication system was installed.

Decommissioning
In 2009, while Doulos was in dry dock in Singapore, a survey conducted by the ship's classification society RINA found numerous significant problems and works with the ship's machinery, structure, and systems that would need to have been completed by 31 December 2009 for the ship's certificates to be reissued and the ship to continue sailing. Because the shipyard servicing the Doulos would not accept the ship for repairs until September 2010, and the cost of the work would be a total in excess of 10 million euros, and the limited ministry that Doulos would have after the repairs, it was decided to end Doulos Ministry at the end of 2009, instead of 2010 as originally planned. The ship was offered for scrap at the end of 2009 when her operational certification expired. A caretaker crew remained with Doulos, expecting to sail her to the breakers.

New owners
On 18 March 2010, Doulos again escaped the breakers and had a new owner, Mr. Eric Saw, director and chief executive of BizNaz Resources International Pte Ltd in Singapore. She was renamed Doulos Phos (Servant of Light).

In 2015, her current owners formed a joint venture with two other companies with the intention of converting the ship into a luxury hotel.  That August the ship was towed out of Singapore to Batam, Indonesia, to be refurbished before moving to the Island of Bintan to become part of a US$25 million hotel resort. In October 2015 she went into drydock, where her hull was refurbished. Steel reinforcement bracing was added inside her hull to support her weight on dry land. She was then towed to a location adjacent to the Bandar Bentan Telani Ferry Terminal. Using a system of pulling cables and air bags, the ship was hoisted onto the promontory point. This marked the end of her career as a floating ship.

Hotel conversion

In February 2016 the ship was officially renamed Doulos Phos, The Ship Hotel and began conversion into a luxury hotel. The conversion is expected to retain the ship's bridge and engine room as part of the Maritime Heritage Museum. Decks A and B are used as the hotel.  Originally scheduled to open in late 2016, workers and heavy equipment were still on the site in November 2017. The hotel opened in 2019 with 104 rooms, all with a sea view.  The hotel closed during the COVID-19 pandemic in 2020 and remains closed as of August 2022.

See also
MV Logos II
MV Logos Hope

References

Further reading
 Elaine Rhoton. (1997) The Doulos Story''. Carlisle: OM Publishing

External links

 Official site
 MV ''Doulos''' history site (Requires Internet Explorer or Goggle Chrome)
 Former owner OM Ships International

Port History as MV Doulos Operated by GBA 1978–2009

1914 ships
Cruise ships
Merchant ships of Germany
Merchant ships of West Germany
Ocean liners
Passenger ships of Italy
Passenger ships of the United States
Ships of Panama
Ships of Malta
Ships built in Newport News, Virginia
Ship libraries